The 2014 NAB Challenge was the Australian Football League (AFL) pre-season competition that was played before the 2014 season. It featured 18 practice matches played over 18 days, beginning February 12 and ending March 1. Unlike previous years, the 2014 competition did not have a Grand Final or overall winner.

Results

Practice matches
Additionally, each club played a further practice match after the NAB Challenge under the regular AFL season rules, however these matches were not televised.

References

NAB Challenge
Australian Football League pre-season competition